Kachura is a gender-neutral East Slavic surname. Notable people with the surname include:
Olga Kachura (1970–2022), Ukrainian-born Russian collaborator
Pyotr Kachura (born 1972), Belarusian football player

See also
 
Alternate spelling of cachua, Peruvian folk dance
Kachura Lakes in Pakistan

Belarusian-language surnames

Ukrainian-language surnames